The Central Corridor is a rail line operated by the Union Pacific Railroad from near Winnemucca, Nevada to Denver, Colorado in the western United States. The line was created after the merger with the Southern Pacific Transportation Company by combining portions of lines built by former competitors. No portion of the line was originally built by the Union Pacific; in fact, some portions were built specifically to compete with the Union Pacific's Overland Route. The line is known for significant feats of engineering while crossing the Wasatch Mountains of Utah and the Rocky Mountains of Colorado. The line features numerous tunnels, the longest and highest of these is the Moffat Tunnel.

Usage
The line is primarily used for freight by the Union Pacific.  The BNSF Railway has trackage rights on the entire line; the Utah Railway has trackage rights from Salt Lake City to Grand Junction, Colorado. However, parts of the line host significant passenger rail traffic. Amtrak's California Zephyr uses the entire length of the Central Corridor, as part of its San Francisco to Chicago route. In addition, the portion from Salt Lake City to Provo, Utah hosts a separate, dedicated track built by the Utah Transit Authority for the southern half of the FrontRunner commuter rail service. A portion of the route immediately northwest of Denver also has dedicated electrified tracks for use by RTD commuter rail.

Route description

Nevada

Proceeding east out of Winnemucca, the route follows the Humboldt River, in a directional running setup with the Overland Route until Wells, Nevada. From Wells to Salt Lake, the route, known as the Shafter Subdivision, loosely follows the historical route of the Hastings Cutoff, tunneling underneath the Pequop Mountains and crossing the Toano Range via Silver Zone Pass. The eastern approach to Silver Zone Pass features a near 360 degree horseshoe curve known as the Arnold loop. After crossing these mountain ranges the route proceeds southwest towards the Great Salt Lake Desert. In Nevada, Interstate 80 follows the Central Corridor, though the two routes are several miles apart in places.

Utah
The route enters Utah at Wendover and crosses the Great Salt Lake Desert and the Bonneville Salt Flats, parallel to Interstate 80 and the Wendover Cut-off, en route to the southern shore of the Great Salt Lake and Salt Lake City. Upon reaching Salt Lake City, the line turns south and follows the Jordan River through Point of the Mountain towards Spanish Fork.

After Spanish Fork, the rail line joins the U.S. Route 6 corridor, and the two follow each other towards Denver. Both routes follow the Spanish Fork (river) up a grade in the Wasatch Plateau, cresting at Soldier Summit. The western approach to Soldier Summit is known for the Gilluly loops, a series of horseshoe curves that allow the railroad to crest the mountains while maintaining grade that never exceeds 2.4%, unlike the highway, which was built using an older railroad grade, that features grades in excess of 5%. The railroad descends from Soldier Summit following the Price River until reaching the town of Helper, so named because in the era of steam locomotives, the railroad added or removed helper engines here for trains crossing Soldier Summit. Upon exiting the Wasatch Mountains, the train follows the southern rim of the Book Cliffs, in route serving the towns of Woodside, Green River (where the rail line crosses the Green River), Thompson Springs and Cisco. Near Cisco is where the rail line for the first time meets the Colorado River, which provides the path up the Rocky Mountains in Colorado. The rail line follows and crosses the river numerous times in Colorado while ascending the Rockies. Ruby Canyon is where the rail line reaches the state line.

Colorado
The railroad enters Colorado along the north bank of the Colorado River, following the river to the Grand Valley, passing through the heart of Grand Junction and surrounding cities along the way. The tracks continue to follow the river out of the valley, routed along Debeque Canyon, Glenwood Canyon and Gore Canyon of the Colorado River towards Granby, Colorado near the headwaters of the river. The railroad departs the main stem of the Colorado river to follow the Fraser River, one of its tributaries until reaching the crest of the Rocky Mountains which is surmounted via the Moffat Tunnel. With the decommissioning of the route over Tennessee Pass, the Moffat Tunnel is the highest point on the Union Pacific system.

The eastern descent from the Moffat Tunnel towards the Front Range, where Denver resides, features 33 tunnels, leading to this portion commonly called the Tunnel District. This portion of the tracks loosely follows Colorado State Highway 72, though at points the two corridors are in different canyons and several miles apart. Even past where the tracks exit the Rocky Mountains, the grade features horseshoe curves in the final descent. The tracks approach the Denver metropolitan area from the northwest, before merging with other rail lines just north of downtown Denver.

Subdivisions

The Union Pacific has divided the Central Corridor into these subdivisions for operational purposes:
Elko Subdivision from Winnemucca to Elko, Nevada
Shafter Subdivision from Elko to the Smelter (Kennecott Smokestack) in Utah
Lynndyl Subdivision from Smelter to Salt Lake City, Utah
Provo Subdivision from Salt Lake City to Helper, Utah
Green River Subdivision from Helper, Utah to Grand Junction, Colorado
Glenwood Springs Subdivision from Grand Junction to Bond, Colorado
Moffat Tunnel Subdivision from Bond to Denver

History
All of the Central Corridor was built by former competitors to the Union Pacific. The portion from Winnemucca to Salt Lake City, Utah was originally part of the Feather River Route, built by the Western Pacific Railroad, acquired by the Union Pacific in 1983. The portion from Salt Lake City to Grand Junction, Colorado is the former Utah Division of the Denver and Rio Grande Western (D&RGW). From Grand Junction to Dotsero, Colorado was part of the Tennessee Pass Line, also built by the D&RGW. From Dotsero to Bond, Colorado is the former Dotsero Cutoff, built by the D&RGW as a connection between their main line with the main of the unfinished Denver and Salt Lake Railroad, which provided the connection from Bond to Denver, Colorado. The portion east of Salt Lake City came under the Union Pacific's control from the 1996 acquisition of the Southern Pacific Transportation Company. The Western Pacific and D&RGW portions of the line were part of the Gould transcontinental system.

See also
Sunset Route

References

Union Pacific Railroad lines
Rail infrastructure in Colorado
Rail infrastructure in Nevada
Rail infrastructure in Utah